Huta Pieniacka – was an ethnic  Polish village of about 1,000 inhabitants until 1939, located in Tarnopol Voivodeship, Poland (modern-day Zolochiv Raion, Lviv Oblast, Ukraine). The site of what was once the village is currently located some 50 km from Ternopil, beside the village of Holubytsia and Peniaky in Zolochiv Raion.

History
During the German-Soviet War the village was the location of the Soviet partisan detachment under the command of NKVD colonel Dmitry Medvedev.

On February 28, 1944 almost all the villagers of Polish ethnic background were murdered,  and the village razed during the Huta Pieniacka massacre in a pre-planned pacification action, by the 4th police regiment, which was later adjoined to the SS Galizien (the conclusion of both Polish and Ukrainian historical commissions). 
The village of Huta Pieniacka no longer exists. Most of the houses were burned during the massacre and only the school and a Roman Catholic church remained. Both of these buildings were demolished after the war, and in the area of the village there is a pasture for cattle. There is a post with a Ukrainian inscription Center of the former village, but it does not mention the name of the village.

Recent events

In 2009, the then presidents of the two countries, Lech Kaczyński and Viktor Yushchenko respectively, visited the site to pay tribute to the victims.

The monument in the now non-existent village of Huta Pieniacka in Lviv region in western Ukraine was erected in memory of the hundreds of people who lived in the then Polish village and were brutally killed in 1944 by a police regiment.

On the 9th of January 2017 the Monument to Polish Victims of World War II Massacre was vandalized. A stone cross was blown up, while two stone tables with the names of the Poles killed during the 1944 massacre were damaged.

The memorial was restored in a month. Ambassador of Poland in Ukraine Jan Pieklo visited memorial on 28 February 2017 during remembrance ceremony and called it "a huge surprise". "This was a miracle of sorts. First, there was information that a cross returned to its place. A consulate employee went to Huta Pieniacka and returned with photos confirming the news. It is a replica of the original cross and it is made of granite", said  Jan Pieklo.

References

Poland in World War II
Former populated places in Ukraine
History of Lviv Oblast